Catephia squamosa, the scaly alchemyst, is a species of moth in the  family Erebidae. The species is found in central, eastern and southern Africa, including some islands of the Indian Ocean.

It has a wingspan of approx. 32 mm.

References

External links
Swedish Museum of Natural History - picture of typus
Pictures at africanmoths.com

Catephia
Moths described in 1856
Moths of Sub-Saharan Africa
Lepidoptera of Cameroon
Moths of Madagascar
Moths of Réunion